John Cartwright may refer to:

John Cartwright (political reformer) (1740–1824), supporter of American independence and British political reform
John Cartwright (painter) (died 1811), English painter and friend of Henry Fuseli
John Solomon Cartwright (1804–1845), Canadian businessman, lawyer, judge, farmer, and political figure
John Cartwright (diplomat), 19th century British consul in Constantinople
John Campbell Cartwright (1888–1973), British philatelist
John Robert Cartwright (1895–1979), Chief Justice of Canada
John Cartwright (businessman) (born 1932), Chief Executive Officer of RJR Nabisco in Ecuador
John Cartwright (British politician) (born 1933), former British Labour and SDP Member of Parliament
John Cartwright (footballer) (born 1940), English professional footballer with West Ham and Crystal Palace in the 1950s and 1960s
John Cartwright (American football) (born 1946), American football player and coach as well as Baptist pastor
John Cartwright (lawyer) (born 1957), professor of contract law at the University of Oxford
John Cartwright (rugby league) (born 1965), Australian rugby league coach and former player